The 1938–39 Challenge Cup was the 39th staging of rugby league's oldest knockout competition, the Challenge Cup.

First round

Second round

Quarter-finals

Semi-finals

Final
Halifax beat Salford 20-3 in the final played at Wembley on Saturday 6 May 1939 in front of a crowd of 55,453.  There would be no Challenge Cup competition in 1939–40.

This was Halifax’s fourth Cup Final win in five Final appearances.

This was Salford’s fifth Final appearance and second in consecutive years, having won the Cup the previous season

Final

References

Challenge Cup
Challenge Cup